P. vicina may refer to:
 Paa vicina, a frog species
 Perenniporia vicina, a fungus species in the genus Perenniporia
 Philoponella vicina, an uloborid spider species
 Phylloxiphia vicina, a moth species in the genus Phylloxiphia
 Poria vicina, a plant pathogen species
 Pterotricha vicina, a ground spider species in the genus Pterotricha

See also
 Vicina (disambiguation)